The 2015–16 All-Ireland Intermediate Club Hurling Championship was the 13th staging of the All-Ireland Junior Club Hurling Championship, the Gaelic Athletic Association's third inter-county club hurling tournament. The championship began on 27 September 2015 and ended on 7 February 2016.

Bennettsbridge were the defending champions but availed of their right to promotion to the intermediate grade.

On 7 February 2016, Glenmore won the championship following a 2–9 to 0–12 defeat of Eoghan Rua. This was their first All-Ireland title in this grade.

Connacht Junior Club Hurling Championship

Connacht semi-final

Connacht final

Leinster Junior Club Hurling Championship

Leinster first round

Leinster quarter-finals

Leinster semi-finals

Leinster final

Munster Junior Club Hurling Championship

Munster quarter-finals

Munster semi-finals

Munster final

Ulster Junior Club Hurling Championship

Ulster preliminary round

Ulster quarter-finals

Ulster semi-finals

Ulster final

All-Ireland Junior Club Hurling Championship

All-Ireland quarter-final

All-Ireland semi-finals

All-Ireland final

External links
 2015–16 All-Ireland Junior Club Hurling Championship fixtures

All-Ireland Junior Club Hurling Championship
All-Ireland Junior Club Hurling Championship
2015